William Forsythe may refer to:

 William Forsythe (actor) (born 1955), American actor
 William Forsythe (choreographer) (born 1949), American dancer and choreographer
 William Forsythe (canoeist), Australian slalom canoeist; see 2008 Canoe Slalom World Cup
 William E. Forsythe (1881–1969), president of the Optical Society of America

See also 
William Forsyth (disambiguation)